Sumayar is a small valley in the Nagar District of Gilgit-Baltistan, Pakistan. The valley is located at the confluence of Hunza River and Nagar River (Pakistan). It is bounded by eroded landscape from the north-east and mountain ridges from the south. Moreover, the valley is composed of nine small villages: Khai, Futhkhai, Yal, Boshat, Rashfari, Resman, Daltho, Thopkhan, and Jotorkhan.

The adjoining areas are Askurdas and Shayar. Sumayar, Askurdas, and Shayar are combinedly known as SAS Valley. The Sumayar valley has numerous tourist attractions including Snowy Mountains such as, Dumani, a north-east side of Diran and Silkiyang Peak, Silkiyang Glacier, Altusill and Menamgusham meadows, Baraimochay Farimuch, and Hayano camping sites, Mamubar stream, and Gemstone mining area Chumar Bakur.

The valley contains the reserves of various Gems and Minerals such as Aquamarine, Fluorite, Apatite, Calcite, and Quartz.  The famous aquamarine mining area Chumar bakhoor or Chumar Bakur is also situated in the Sumayar Valley.

Geography 
The valley is located at the confluence of two rivers; Hunza River and Nagar River (Pakistan). It is surrounded by Nagarkhas from the east, Askurdas from the west, Ganesh from the north, and mountain ridges including Diran from the south.

Geomorphology 

The highest peak, Diran, is in the southern part of the valley. There are several tributaries to the principal stream, Mamubar. The valley can be divided into three geomorphological units: The upper part; the middle part and the lower part.

The Upper part: The upper and southern part of the valley is usually covered with ice and a glacier. The upper part of the valley can be conveniently further divided into two parts - the extreme upper region that is occupied by a permanent glacier Silkiang and Ghamultur. And the lower region is of relatively low ascent with snaking of the Mamubar stream. At places, it is occupied with avalanches and materials from lateral moraines.

The Middle part: The middle region of the valley is a narrow canyon that is flanked by high precipices, probably due to outcrop rock of the Sumayar granite. This part of the valley is mostly covered by deep snow during the winter.

The Lower part: The Lower part is comparatively wide and open. On the terraces of the valley, there is vegetation but the remaining areas of skeletal soil are lacking agricultural activity. The depth of the Mamuber stream increases and flows as a single channel.

Chumar Bakhoor (Chumar Bakur) 

Geographically it is also closer to the Nagarkhas. The Chumar Bakhoor pass links the Sumayar valley with the Nagar Khas. Walking from central Sumayar, it takes around 4 to 5 hours to reach the pegmatites that crop out on the western side of the mountain above 4000 meters elevation. Appiani (2007) states that according to (Blauwet and Shah, 2004) the gemstone deposits at Chumar Bakhoor were first discovered in 1984 by local hunter Muhammad Shah. 
According to Blauwet (2006), the prominent fluorite locality in Pakistan is Chumar Bakhoor, which Blauwet notes is generally called Nagar. The fluorite occurs here in a variety of colors and crystal habits, that includes cubes, octahedra, and dodecahedra. Spinel-law twins have also been found here in incredible sizes.

Octahedral fluorite from the pegmatites of Chumar Bakhoor of Sumayar valley, Nagar district has been known for quite some time. Green, white to pink fluorite associated with gemmy aquamarine, and pale pink to dark orange-pink fluorapatite on muscovite druses from the Chumar Bakhoor have been reaching the market since 1984. According to Appiani, (2007) the size and variety of fluorite crystals from the chumar Bakhoor; and the equal-sized crystals of fluorite, aquamarine, and fluorapatite together on the Matrix Specimens are extremely impressive. 
Pink octahedral crystals, from Pakistan, sometimes associated with aquamarine and fluorapatite on muscovite, have been known for many years. However, the specimens from the Chumar Bakoor are far superior to those from previous discoveries, ranking them among the finest known examples of the species.

Peaks, glaciers and meadows

Peaks 
Dumani (North-east side of Diran)
Silkiyang Peak

Glaciers 
Silkiyang Glacier
Ghaintur Glacier

Meadows 
Silkiyang
Menamgusham
Baraimuch-e-fari
Goyosho
Harai Ghutom

Regular avalanche tracks
Manbull Har
Saaelji Har
Menamgusham Har 
Silkiyang Har

Waterfalls and streams

Waterfalls 
Shotti Gor Waterfall
Manbull Waterfall

Streams
Mamubar stream

Valleys nearby
Nagarkhas
Hoper Valley
Hispar
Gappa Valley
SAS Valley

References 

Valleys of Gilgit-Baltistan
Nagar District